Puerto Rico and its OTI member station, Telemundo Puerto Rico (Now WKAQ-TV) was one of the founding countries of the OTI Festival and debuted in the show in 1972 in Madrid, competing uninterruptedly from the very first edition until the last show held in Acapulco in 2000.

History 
Puerto Rico, whose broadcaster selected its performers internally, had a promising start in the OTI Song Contest. In fact, the broadcaster always selected big names in order to compete in the event. The Caribbean island won the contest on two occasions, the first time with Nydia Caro and her song "Hoy sólo canto por cantar" (Today I just sing for singing) in 1974. This song, composed by Ricardo Cerrato, was enormously popular and very controversial for being considered an "anti-protest" song.

Six years later, in Buenos Aires, the Puerto Rican branch of Telemundo recorded its second victory in the festival with Rafael José and his song "Contigo, mujer" (With you woman), which was composed by Laureano Brizuela and Ednita Nazario.

Apart from their victories, the country managed to reach the top 10 in 8 occasions, but from 1983 on, the results of Puerto Rico in the contest started declining, In fact, since then, Telemundo was unable to reach the top ten positions again, until the last edition of the show in 2000, when the country got the second place with the media personality, José Vega Santana and his song "Con una canción" (With one song).

Telemundo Puerto Rico, hosted the OTI Festival in 1975 after the victory of Nydia Caro the previous year, according to the original rules of the show. The venue of the contest were the TV Studios of Telemundo in San Juan. The broadcaster created a colorful stage with a central platform and an orchestra section in the background.

Contestants 
Table key

References 

OTI Festival
Puerto Rican music